The 2018 BVIFA National Football League is the ninth season of the football league in the British Virgin Islands. The season started on 18 February and ended on 18 August 2018.

Standings

References

External links
BVIFA

BVIFA National Football League seasons
British Virgin Islands
football